African Natural History was a scientific journal published by Iziko Museums (Cape Town). It took the place of the Annals of the South African Museum, which has been discontinued. Now the journal has been discontinued.

External links 
 

Biology journals
Annual journals
English-language journals
Publications established in 2005